Nur al-Dahr Ali or Nur al-Din Ali was the 38th imam of the Qasim-Shahi branch of the Nizari Isma'ili community.

Nur al-Dahr Ali succeeded his father Khalil Allah I when the latter died in March 1634, until his own death in November 1671. Like his father, he resided and was buried at Anjudan, where his tombstone survives to this day.

He was succeeded by his son, Khalil Allah II Ali.

References

Sources

 

17th-century births
1671 deaths
Nizari imams
17th-century Iranian people
Iranian Ismailis
17th-century Ismailis
17th-century Islamic religious leaders
People from Markazi Province